Machover is a surname. Notable people with the surname include:

Daniel Machover, British lawyer
Karen Machover (1902-1996), Belarus-born American psychologist
Moshé Machover (born 1936), British mathematician
Solomon Machover (1906-1976), American psychologist
Tod Machover (born 1953), American composer